In mathematics, the Eisenstein integers (named after Gotthold Eisenstein), occasionally also known as Eulerian integers (after Leonhard Euler), are the complex numbers of the form 

is a primitive (hence non-real) cube root of unity. The Eisenstein integers form a triangular lattice in the complex plane, in contrast with the Gaussian integers, which form a square lattice in the complex plane. The Eisenstein integers are a countably infinite set.

Properties 
The Eisenstein integers form a commutative ring of algebraic integers in the algebraic number field  — the third cyclotomic field. To see that the Eisenstein integers are algebraic integers note that each  is a root of the monic polynomial

In particular,  satisfies the equation

The 2-norm of an Eisenstein integer is just its squared modulus, and is given by 

which is clearly a positive ordinary (rational) integer.

Also, the complex conjugate of  satisfies

The group of units in this ring is the cyclic group formed by the sixth roots of unity in the complex plane:  the Eisenstein integers of norm 1.

Euclidean domain
The ring of Eisenstein integers forms a Euclidean domain whose norm  is given by the square modulus, as above:

A division algorithm, applied to any dividend  and divisor , gives a quotient 
 and a remainder  smaller than the divisor, satisfying:

Here  are all Eisenstein integers. This algorithm implies the Euclidean algorithm, which proves Euclid's lemma and the unique factorization of Eisenstein integers into Eisenstein primes.

One division algorithm is as follows.  First perform the division in the field of complex numbers, and write the quotient in terms of ω:

 
for rational . Then obtain the Eisenstein integer quotient by rounding the rational coefficients to the nearest integer:

Here  may denote any of the standard rounding-to-integer functions.

The reason this satisfies , while the analogous procedure fails for most other quadratic integer rings, is as follows. A fundamental domain for the ideal , acting by translations on the complex plane, is the 60°–120° rhombus with vertices . Any Eisenstein integer α lies inside one of the translates of this parallelogram, and the quotient  is one of its vertices. The remainder is the square distance from α to this vertex, but the maximum possible distance in our algorithm is only , so . (The size of ρ could be slightly decreased by taking  to be the closest corner.)

Eisenstein primes

A non-unit Eisenstein integer  is said to be an Eisenstein prime if its only non-unit divisors are of the form , where  is any of the six units. They are the corresponding concept to the Gaussian primes in the Gaussian integers.

There are two types of Eisenstein prime.

The first few Eisenstein primes of the form  are:

 2, 5, 11, 17, 23, 29, 41, 47, 53, 59, 71, 83, 89, 101, ... .

Natural primes that are congruent to 0 or 1 modulo 3 are not Eisenstein primes: they admit nontrivial factorizations in Z[ω]. For example:
 
 .

 .

Some non-real Eisenstein primes are

Up to conjugacy and unit multiples, the primes listed above, together with 2 and 5, are all the Eisenstein primes of absolute value not exceeding 7.

, the largest known real Eisenstein prime is the ninth largest known prime , discovered by Péter Szabolcs and PrimeGrid. All larger known primes are Mersenne primes, discovered by GIMPS.

The quotient of the complex plane  by the lattice containing all Eisenstein integers is a complex torus of real dimension 2. This is one of two tori with maximal symmetry among all such complex tori. This torus can be obtained by identifying each of the three pairs of opposite edges of a regular hexagon.

See also
 Gaussian integer
 Cyclotomic field
 Systolic geometry
 Hermite constant
 Cubic reciprocity
 Loewner's torus inequality
 Hurwitz quaternion
 Quadratic integer
 Dixon elliptic functions

Notes

External links 
 Eisenstein Integer--from MathWorld

Algebraic numbers
Quadratic irrational numbers
Cyclotomic fields
Lattice points
Systolic geometry
Integers